is a former Japanese football player.

Playing career
Mashimo was born in Isesaki on March 6, 1974. After graduating from Senshu University, he joined Japan Football League club Montedio Yamagata in 1996. He played many matches as forward and the club was promoted to new league J2 League from 1999. In 1999, he played in all matches and scored 18 goals. This is 2nd place in scorer ranking after Takuya Jinno (19 goals). However he could hardly score goals in 2000 and was released from the club end of 2000 season. In 2001, he moved to his local club Tonan SC in Regional Leagues and played in 2 seasons.

Club statistics

References

External links

1974 births
Living people
Senshu University alumni
Association football people from Gunma Prefecture
Japanese footballers
J2 League players
Japan Football League (1992–1998) players
Montedio Yamagata players
Association football forwards